Rififi in Stockholm also titled Blueprint for a Million is a 1961 Swedish drama crime film directed by Hasse Ekman.

Cast
Gunnar Hellström as Erik "Jerka", robber
Maude Adelson as Mona Hansson
Tor Isedal as Janne, robber
Nils Hallberg as Peter Bergefrag, robber
Curt Masreliez as Esse, robber
Hjördis Petterson as Mrs. Jansson
Gunnar Nielsen as Bertil, guard
Harry Ahlin as Snyftarn
Eric Stolpe as Hampe, boxer
Bengt Eklund as croupier

External links

1961 films
1961 crime drama films
Films directed by Hasse Ekman
1960s Swedish-language films
Swedish crime drama films
Swedish black-and-white films
1960s Swedish films